Pazardzhik Municipality is the second largest municipality in Pazardzhik Province, after Velingrad. It occupies 640 km2 or 14.3% of the province. Its territory encompasses the westernmost parts of the Upper Thracian Plain and is famous for its fertility.

Demography
The population of 134,295 lives in 32 settlements which include one town (Pazardzhik) and 31 villages.

Religion
According to the latest Bulgarian census of 2011, the religious composition, among those who answered the optional question on religious identification, was the following:

References

Municipalities in Pazardzhik Province